Stacian Facey (born 9 August 1993) is a Jamaican netball player. She was part of the teams that won bronze at the 2014 and 2018 Commonwealth Games, and that placed fourth at the 2015 Netball World Cup.

References

1993 births
Living people
Jamaican netball players
Place of birth missing (living people)
Netball players at the 2018 Commonwealth Games
Commonwealth Games bronze medallists for Jamaica
Commonwealth Games medallists in netball
2019 Netball World Cup players
Medallists at the 2014 Commonwealth Games
Medallists at the 2018 Commonwealth Games